Aimée Lou Wood  (born 3 February 1994)  is an English actress. After early stage roles in Mary Stuart (2016–2017) and People, Places and Things (2017), Wood made her screen debut on the Netflix series Sex Education (2019–present), which won her a British Academy Television Award for Best Female Comedy Performance from two nominations. She earned award nominations for her starring role in the play Uncle Vanya (2020), and appeared in the films The Electrical Life of Louis Wain (2021) and Living (2022).

Early life
Wood is from Stockport, Greater Manchester. Her mother works for Childline and her father is a car dealer. Following her parents' divorce, she attended Cheadle Hulme School, and mostly retained her regional accent. Thereafter, she took a Foundation Course at the Oxford School of Drama, and went on to graduate with a Bachelor of Arts in Acting from the Royal Academy of Dramatic Art (RADA) in 2017.

Career 

Wood's agent is Lizzie Newell, Independent Talent Group. During her time at RADA, Wood was involved in many productions, such as playing Margaret in a production of Scuttlers directed by Hannah Eidinow, and as Goody in Vinegar Tom, directed by Cressida Brown. She began her professional acting career in 2016 by working on stage productions, making her debut as a handmaiden in the play Mary Stuart, performed at the Almeida Theatre in London until 2017. Following this, she starred as Laura in the production People, Places and Things, a role that was performed numerous times by Wood on a tour across the UK.

In 2019, Wood made her screen debut as Aimee Gibbs, a main character in the Netflix comedy-drama series Sex Education, where she co-stars alongside Asa Butterfield, Emma Mackey, Ncuti Gatwa and Gillian Anderson. She had originally auditioned for the part of Lily, which was ultimately given to Tanya Reynolds, but accepted the role of Aimee when she was offered. The series went on to receive critical acclaim, and Wood's performance earned praise. At the 2021 British Academy Television Awards, she won the British Academy Television Award for Best Female Comedy Performance, which is both her first accolade and her first award received from a major association; she earned another nomination for the award at the 2022 British Academy Television Awards. Amidst her work on Sex Education, Wood has continued to take roles in theatre, reasoning that "I know a lot of screen actors who think they left it too long to go back on stage and now they have really bad stage fright."

In 2020, Wood played Jess in Hen, a short film directed by James Larkin. That same year, she was cast in the pivotal role of Sonya in the production Uncle Vanya, which was recorded during the COVID-19 pandemic at the Harold Pinter Theatre and obtained both a cinematic release as well as a BBC national release in the same year. Uncle Vanya and Wood's performance was lauded by critics. On her portrayal of Sonya, WhatsOnStage wrote that "she is a glorious, kind, gentle girl ... Her attempts at cheerfulness in the face of so much crushing disappointment are almost unbearable. [Wood] positively shines."

In 2021, Wood joined the jury of the British Short Film Awards and had the honour of announcing the winner later that year. She made her feature film debut as Claire Wain in the 2021 biographical film The Electrical Life of Louis Wain, which earned positive reviews from critics. She landed her first lead film role opposite Bill Nighy in the Oliver Hermanus drama feature Living, an English remake of the 1952 Japanese film Ikiru, which premiered at the 2022 Sundance Film Festival and earned acclaim.

Personal life
Wood was in a relationship with her Sex Education co-star Connor Swindells, who in the series portrays Adam Groff, from January 2019 to sometime before March 2020. She has struggled with her body image, revealing in a 2020 interview with Glamour magazine that "I have suffered with body dysmorphia my whole life. ... I remember before the first sex scene (in Sex Education), I thought, 'Right, okay. I'll start eating salads every day,' and I just didn't. That was such a turning point for me, making that decision to go, 'Actually, I'm not going to alter how my body looks before this scene because this is how my body looks.'"

Filmography

Film

Television

Stage roles

Accolades

References

External links

Aimee Lou Wood on Independent Talent Group
Instagram

Living people
1994 births
21st-century English actresses
Actresses from Greater Manchester
Alumni of RADA
English stage actresses
English television actresses
People educated at Cheadle Hulme School
Actors from Stockport